HAT-P-27, also known as WASP-40, is the primary of a binary star system about 650 light-years away. It is a G-type main-sequence star. The star's age is similar to the Sun's at 4.4 billion years. HAT-P-27 is enriched in heavy elements, having a 195% concentration of iron compared to the Sun.

The very dim stellar companion was detected in 2015 at a projected separation of 0.656″ and proven to be physically bound to the system in 2016.

Planetary system
In 2011 a transiting hot Jupiter type planet b was detected in a mildly eccentric orbit. The planetary equilibrium temperature is 1207 K. The survey in 2013 failed to find any Rossiter-McLaughlin effect and therefore was unable to constrain the inclination of planetary orbit to the equatorial plane of the parent star. No orbital decay was detected as in 2018, despite the close proximity of the planet to the star.

The presence of an additional planet in the system has been suspected since 2015.

References

Virgo (constellation)
G-type main-sequence stars
Binary stars
Planetary systems with one confirmed planet
Planetary transit variables
J14510418+0556505